Nurul Elfira Loy binti Ahmad Sabri (born March 8, 1994) also known by her popular name Nurul Elfira Loy is a Malaysia actress. She debuted in her first telemovie drama Cinta Itu Buta where she acted as a school girl. She is known for her role as Qalesya in the hit drama Qalesya and as Amirah in Disney's Waktu Rehat. Elfira's siblings, Ahmad Ezzrin Loy and Nurul Ezlisa Loy are both actors.

Early life 
Nurul Elfira Loy Binti Ahmad Sabri, was born on 8 March 1994 in Kuala Lumpur, Malaysia. She is the second child of Ahmad Sabri Haji Ariffin and Filzah Yusoff. She has five siblings: eldest brother Ahmad Ezzraa Loy, younger sister Nurul Ezlisa Loy, younger brother Ahmad Ezzrin Loy and youngest brother Ahmad Evvraa Loy.  She is of Malays, Chinese and Arabian descent. She had completed her secondary education in SMK Bandar Tun Hussein Onn, Cheras and after that pursuing her tertiary education at KDU University College, in Ent Arts.

Career

Early Years (2006–2011) 
Elfira started her acting career at the age of 12 as a child performer in Ali Baba: The Musical Theater (2006). She represented Malaysia with seven other child actors for Ali Baba: The Musical Theater in Hamedan International Theater Festival for Children and Youth Adults that took place on 27 September to 5 October 2010. She also involved for Ibu Zain Theater Season 1 and 2. She was dubbed in her first telemovie drama as titled Cinta Itu Buta performed as school girl character. She continued her interest in acting and involved in many dramas. She made an appearance in Damping Malam (2010). She played the character Rin in a Japanese film titled 'Second Chance' that was released in 2011. At the same time, Elfira was also chosen as the new representative and endorsed by Astro for two years. This meant that Elfira was 'pegged' and not allowed to star in any non-Astro production. (2011–2012)

Recent Career (2012–present) 
In 2012, she acted as Juju in the movie Jangan Ambil Padang Kami; a story based on life of flat residents and Bella in hit drama Dalam Hati Ada Taman (2012) together with Randy Pangalila. Elfira also worked on several film projects such as Rentap: The Movie, Plus One, Permata Hatiku, etc. She was also appointed as the brand ambassador for Maybelline New York (Malaysia) (2012) and Sofy (2013).

TV commercials 
Elfira Loy is also model and actress for TV commercials and advertisements for brands such as Motosikal Honda, Sunway Lagoon, Mee Sedap, Institut Jantung Negara, Bank RHB, Mamee Slurp and The New Face Of Maybelline New York (Malaysia).

Filmography

Film

Drama

Telemovie Drama

Program Host/ TV Shows

TV commercials

Musical Theatre

Voice Over

Awards and nominations

References

External links 
 Nurul Elfira Loy – Official Website
 Nurul Elfira Loy – Karya tempatan, Disney, Utusan Malaysia 21 Ogos 2010.

Living people
1994 births
People from Kuala Lumpur
Malaysian people of Arab descent
Malaysian people of Chinese descent
Malaysian people of Malay descent
Malaysian Muslims
Malaysian film actresses
Malaysian television actresses
Malaysian child actresses
21st-century Malaysian actresses